Cilka Sadar (born 18 September 1991) is a Slovenian snowboarder. She competed at the 2010 Winter Olympics in Vancouver, Canada, where she finished 17th in halfpipe. Sadar also qualified for the 2014 Winter Olympics, however, she injured her knee during the practice in Sochi and had to withdraw from the games without competing.

References

1991 births
Living people
Slovenian female snowboarders
Snowboarders at the 2010 Winter Olympics
Olympic snowboarders of Slovenia
Sportspeople from Ljubljana